The Andean duck (Oxyura ferruginea) is a bird species native to the Andean Mountains of South America, one of the stiff-tailed ducks. It was considered a subspecies of the ruddy duck.  In fact, some taxonomic authorities still consider it conspecific, including the American Ornithological Society.

Description
These are small, compact ducks with stout, scoop-shaped bills, and long, stiff tails they often hold cocked upward. They have slightly peaked heads and fairly short, thick necks.  In summer, they have rich chestnut bodies with bright blue bills. In winter, they are dull gray-brown above and paler below with dull gray bills. Females and first-year males are brownish, somewhat like winter males but with a blurry stripe across the pale cheek patch. It is separable from the ruddy duck by its all-black face and larger size.

Breeding and habits
Their breeding habitat is marshy lakes and ponds. They nest in dense marsh vegetation near water. The female builds the nest out of grass, locating it in tall vegetation to hide it from predators. A typical brood contains 5 to 15 ducklings.

These birds dive and swim underwater. They mainly eat seeds and roots of aquatic plants, aquatic insects and crustaceans.

References

Andean duck
Andean duck
Birds of the Andes
Andean duck
Andean duck